Carrao or Carrão may refer to:

 Carrão (district of São Paulo), an administrative district of São Paulo, Brazil
 Carrão (São Paulo Metro), a railway station in the district
 Vila Carrão, a historic borough in the district
 Carrao River, a river of Venezuela
 Limpkin or carrao, a species of bird

People with the surname
 Humberto Carrão (born 1991), Brazilian actor

See also
 Carrao-tepui, a table-top mountain or mesa in Venezuela
 José Bracho or Carrao Bracho (1928–2011), Venezuelan baseball player
 El Carrao de Palmarito (1928–2002), Venezuelan singer